Michael Walker (born June 12, 1988) is an Australian-American baseball third baseman for the Melbourne Aces of the Australian Baseball League. He was drafted by the Brewers in the 14th round of the 2010 Major League Baseball Draft after his senior season for the Pacific Tigers baseball team. He played for Team Australia in the 2013 World Baseball Classic.

References

External links

1988 births
Living people
Baseball players from California
Baseball third basemen
Helena Brewers players
Wisconsin Timber Rattlers players
Brevard County Manatees players
2013 World Baseball Classic players
Pacific Tigers baseball players
Huntsville Stars players
People from Marysville, California
Melbourne Aces players